Central Cikarang is a district of Bekasi Regency which serves as its seat. The district was established in 2001, as a result of division of Lemahabang and Serang Districts into 4 new districts. The district was previously known as Karangjati. Geographically, Central Cikarang is located southeast of the other Cikarang districts, however it is named Central Cikarang to emphasize its importance as the administrative center of Bekasi Regency.

Administrative divisions
Central Cikarang is divided into 6 villages which are as follows:

Cicau [id]
Hegarmanah [id]
Jayamukti [id]
Pasirranji [id]
Pasirtanjung [id]
Sukamahi [id]

See also
 Cikarang

References 

Bekasi Regency
Regency seats of West Java